In probability theory and directional statistics, a wrapped probability distribution is a continuous probability distribution that describes data points that lie on a unit n-sphere. In one dimension, a wrapped distribution consists of points on the unit circle.

Any probability density function  on the line can be "wrapped" around the circumference of a circle of unit radius. That is, the PDF of the wrapped variable

 in some interval of length 

is
 

which is a periodic sum of period .

Theory
In most situations, a process involving circular statistics produces angles which lie in the interval , and are described by an "unwrapped" probability density function . However, a measurement will yield an angle  which lies in some interval of length  (for example, 0 to ). In other words, a measurement cannot tell whether the true angle  or a wrapped angle , where  is some unknown integer, has been measured.

If we wish to calculate the expected value of some function of the measured angle it will be:

.

We can express the integral as a sum of integrals over periods of :

.

This can be resolved by introducing the parameter , since  has an unambiguous relationship to the true angle :

.

Calculating the expected value of a function of  will yield unambiguous answers:

.

For this reason, the  parameter is preferred over measured angles  in circular statistical analysis. This suggests that the wrapped distribution function may itself be expressed as a function of  such that:

where  is defined such that . This concept can be extended to the multivariate context by an extension of the simple sum to a number of  sums that cover all dimensions in the feature space:
 
where  is the th Euclidean basis vector.

Expression in terms of characteristic functions
A fundamental wrapped distribution is the Dirac comb, which is a wrapped Dirac delta function:

.

Using the delta function, a general wrapped distribution can be written

.

Exchanging the order of summation and integration, any wrapped distribution can be written as the convolution of the unwrapped distribution and a Dirac comb:

.

The Dirac comb may also be expressed as a sum of exponentials, so we may write:

.

Again exchanging the order of summation and integration:

.

or

Analogous to linear distributions,  is referred to as the characteristic function of the wrapped distribution (or more accurately, the characteristic sequence). This is an instance of the Poisson summation formula, and it can be seen that the coefficients of the Fourier series for the wrapped distribution are simply the coefficients of the Fourier transform of the unwrapped distribution at integer values.

Moments
The moments of the wrapped distribution  are defined as:

.

Expressing  in terms of the characteristic function and exchanging the order of integration and summation yields:

.

From the residue theorem we have

where  is the Kronecker delta function. It follows that the moments are simply equal to the characteristic function of the unwrapped distribution for integer arguments:

.

Generation of random variates 

Entropy 
The information entropy of a circular distribution with probability density  is defined as:

where  is any interval of length . If both the probability density and its logarithm can be expressed as a Fourier series (or more generally, any integral transform on the circle), the orthogonal basis of the series can be used to obtain a closed form expression for the entropy.

The moments of the distribution  are the Fourier coefficients for the Fourier series expansion of the probability density:

.

If the logarithm of the probability density can also be expressed as a Fourier series:

where

.

Then, exchanging the order of integration and summation, the entropy may be written as:

.

Using the orthogonality of the Fourier basis, the integral may be reduced to:

.

For the particular case when the probability density is symmetric about the mean,  and the logarithm may be written:

and

and, since normalization requires that , the entropy may be written:

.

See also
 Wrapped normal distribution
 Wrapped Cauchy distribution
 Wrapped exponential distribution

References

External links
 Circular Values Math and Statistics with C++11, A C++11 infrastructure for circular values (angles, time-of-day, etc.) mathematics and statistics

Types of probability distributions
Directional statistics